Before the Sun Explodes is a 2016 American drama film directed by Debra Eisenstadt and featuring Sarah Butler, Christine Woods and Amir Arison.

Cast

References

External links
 
 

American drama films
2016 drama films
2010s English-language films
2010s American films